Francisco Javier Pizarro Cartes (born 10 May 1989) is a Chilean footballer who plays for Colchagua as a striker.

Club career

O'Higgins

Pizarro in 2013 signed for O'Higgins on a one-year loan from Universidad Católica. On 10 December 2013, he won the Apertura 2013-14 with O'Higgins. In the tournament, he played in 15 of 18 matches and scored 4 goals.

Barnechea

In 2014, he is signed by Barnechea for the 2014–15 Chilean Primera División season

International career
Pizarro represented Chile U23 at the 2008 Inter Continental Cup in Malaysia, scoring a goal. The next year he represented Chile U20 at the 2009 South American U-20 Championship.

At senior level, he has been capped three times.

Honours

Club
Universidad Católica
Primera División de Chile (1): 2010
Copa Chile (1): 2011

O'Higgins
Primera División de Chile (1): 2013 Apertura

Individual

O'Higgins
Medalla Santa Cruz de Triana: 2014

References

External links

1989 births
Living people
People from Osorno, Chile
People from Osorno Province
People from Los Lagos Region
Chilean footballers
Chilean expatriate footballers
Chile youth international footballers
Chile under-20 international footballers
Chile international footballers
Club Deportivo Universidad Católica footballers
Cobreloa footballers
O'Higgins F.C. footballers
A.C. Barnechea footballers
Unión La Calera footballers
Oman Club players
Santiago Morning footballers
Deportes Colchagua footballers
Chilean Primera División players
Primera B de Chile players
Oman Professional League players
Ascenso MX players
Segunda División Profesional de Chile players
Expatriate footballers in Oman
Expatriate footballers in Mexico
Chilean expatriate sportspeople in Oman
Chilean expatriate sportspeople in Mexico
Chilean expatriates in Mexico
Association football forwards